The 2020 UAB Blazers football team represented the University of Alabama at Birmingham in the 2020 NCAA Division I FBS football season. The Blazers played their final home games at Legion Field in Birmingham, Alabama, and competed in the West Division of Conference USA (C-USA). They were led by fifth-year head coach Bill Clark.

After compiling a 6–3 record (3–1 in conference play), the team accepted a bid to the Gasparilla Bowl. However, on December 22, the Blazers' bowl opponent, South Carolina, had to withdraw from the bowl due to COVID-19 issues within their program. As no replacement team was available, the bowl was subsequently canceled.

Previous season
The Blazers finished the 2019 regular season 9–5, 6–2 in CUSA play which they tied for first in the West Division with Louisiana Tech. Due to defeating the Bulldogs in the head-to-head matchup, UAB played against Florida Atlantic in the conference championship game. The Blazers played in the game for the second consecutive year, which they lost in the game for the first time. The team was invited to play in the New Orleans Bowl against Appalachian State, where the Blazers took their fifth loss of the season.

Preseason

Death of Jamari Smith
On May 28, 2020, it was announced that incoming freshman Jamari Smith, from Robert E. Lee High School in Montgomery, Alabama, had drowned while swimming with friends.

Award watch lists 
Listed in the order that they were released

CUSA media days
The CUSA Media Days will be held virtually for the first time in conference history.

Preseason All-CUSA teams
To be released

Schedule
UAB announced its 2020 football schedule on January 8, 2020. The 2020 schedule was originally planned to consist of 6 home and 6 away games in the regular season.

The Blazers had games scheduled against Alabama A&M, New Mexico State, Old Dominion, UTEP, and Middle Tennessee but were canceled due to the COVID-19 pandemic.

Rankings

Game summaries

Central Arkansas

at Miami

at South Alabama

UTSA

Western Kentucky

Louisiana

at Louisiana Tech

at Middle Tennessee

at Rice

Players drafted into the NFL

References

UAB
UAB Blazers football seasons
Conference USA football champion seasons
UAB Blazers football